Rhescuporis IV (flourished 3rd century – died 234) was a Roman client king of the Bosporan Kingdom. Like many other late Bosporan kings, Rhescuporis IV is known only from coinage, which means his relationship to the other kings is unknown, as are details of his accession and reign. His coins are known from the period 233–234, meaning that he appears to have co-ruled with Cotys III.

See also
 Bosporan Kingdom
 Roman Crimea

References 

235 deaths
Rhescuporis 4
Ancient Romans from outside Rome
Year of birth unknown
Roman client rulers
3rd-century monarchs in Europe
Rhescuporis, Tiberius 4

fr:Rhescuporis IV